Bernard Mosiuoa Mohlalisi O.M.I. (March 16, 1933 – July 24, 2020) was the Archbishop of the Roman Catholic Archdiocese of Maseru in Lesotho from 1990 to 2009. On June 30, 2009, his resignation due to age was accepted by Pope Benedict XVI. He was succeeded as Archbishop by Gerard Tlali Lerotholi, O.M.I., a professor at the National University of Lesotho.

Mohlalisi was ordained as a priest on July 14, 1963.

References

External links 
 Bernard Mohlalisi at the Catholic-hierarchy.org

1933 births
2020 deaths
Lesotho Roman Catholic archbishops
20th-century Roman Catholic archbishops in Africa
21st-century Roman Catholic archbishops in Africa
Roman Catholic archbishops of Maseru
Missionary Oblates of Mary Immaculate